Coripata Municipality is the second municipal section of the Nor Yungas Province in the  La Paz Department, Bolivia. Its seat is Coripata.

See also 
 P'iqi Q'ara

References 

 Instituto Nacional de Estadistica de Bolivia

Municipalities of La Paz Department (Bolivia)